The Central District of Gachsaran County is a district (bakhsh) in Gachsaran County, Kohgiluyeh and Boyer-Ahmad Province, Iran. At the 2006 census, its population was 109,458, in 24,242 families.  The District has one city: Dogonbadan. The District has four rural districts (dehestan): Bibi Hakimeh Rural District, Boyer Ahmad-e Garmsiri Rural District, Emamzadeh Jafar Rural District, and Lishtar Rural District.

References 

Districts of Kohgiluyeh and Boyer-Ahmad Province
Gachsaran County